Takeshi Sato (born June 8, 1981) is a Japanese professional wrestler, signed to Pro Wrestling Secret Base

He is the twin brother of mixed martial artist Takenori Sato.

Biography
He debuted in 2005 in Dragon Gate. He wrestled in exhibition matches with Yamato Onodera/YAMATO until the summer of 2006. He was thought to have retired but turned up in El Dorado Wrestling in January 2007 as Go. He quickly gained a strong fan base & joined Shuji Kondo's SUKIYAKI stable at first. He then betrayed him & joined the HELL DEMONS faction. Go and the Brahman brothers faced Toru Owashi, Takuya Sugawara and Nobutaka Araya for the vacant UWA World Trios Championship but did not win the belts.

Championships and accomplishments

Pro Wrestling Secret Base
Captain of the Secret Base Openweight Championship (2 times)
Captain of the Secret Base Openweight Tag Team Championship (1 time) – with Amigo Suzuki

Mixed martial arts record

|-
|Draw
|align=center| 0–0–1
|
|Draw
|Kingdom of Grapple: Live 2007
|
|align=center| 2
|align=center| 5:00
|Tokyo, Japan
|

References

External links
Pro Wrestling El Dorado~The Next DOOR Project~

Japanese male professional wrestlers
Living people
1981 births